This is a list of species in the crustose lichen genus Ocellularia.  , Species Fungorum accepts 343 species of Ocellularia.

A

Ocellularia abbayesiana 
Ocellularia africana 
Ocellularia agasthiensis  – India
Ocellularia alba 
Ocellularia albobullata 
Ocellularia albocincta 
Ocellularia albocolumellata  – New Caledonia
Ocellularia albogilva 
Ocellularia albomaculata 
Ocellularia albothallina  – New Caledonia
Ocellularia albula 
Ocellularia allospora 
Ocellularia allosporiza 
Ocellularia americana 
Ocellularia andamanica 
Ocellularia annuloelevata  – India
Ocellularia antillensis 
Ocellularia apayoensis 
Ocellularia aptrootiana  – Sri Lanka
Ocellularia arachchigei 
Ocellularia arecae 
Ocellularia ascidioidea 
Ocellularia auberianoides 
Ocellularia auratipruinosa  – Costa Rica
Ocellularia aurulenta 
Ocellularia australiana 
Ocellularia austroafricana 
Ocellularia austropacifica

B
Ocellularia bahiana 
Ocellularia baileyi 
Ocellularia balangoda  – Sri Lanka
Ocellularia baorucensis 
Ocellularia bataana 
Ocellularia bipindensis 
Ocellularia bonplandii 
Ocellularia brasiliensis  – Brazil
Ocellularia brunneospora  – Thailand
Ocellularia buckii 
Ocellularia bullata

C

Ocellularia caledoniensis 
Ocellularia cameroonensis 
Ocellularia canara  – India
Ocellularia canariana  – India
Ocellularia capensis  – Africa
Ocellularia caraibica 
Ocellularia carassensis 
Ocellularia carnosula 
Ocellularia cavata 
Ocellularia cerebriformis  – Thailand
Ocellularia chiriquiensis 
Ocellularia chonestoma 
Ocellularia cicra  – Peru
Ocellularia cinerascens 
Ocellularia cinerea 
Ocellularia circumscripta 
Ocellularia cloonanii  – Sri Lanka
Ocellularia cocosensis 
Ocellularia collativa 
Ocellularia comayaguana 
Ocellularia comparabilis 
Ocellularia concentrica 
Ocellularia concolor 
Ocellularia conferta 
Ocellularia confluens 
Ocellularia conformalis 
Ocellularia conformis 
Ocellularia confundita  – Thailand
Ocellularia confusa 
Ocellularia conpsoromica 
Ocellularia coronata  – Cuba
Ocellularia craterella 
Ocellularia crocea 
Ocellularia croceoisidiata  – Venezuela
Ocellularia cryptica 
Ocellularia curranii

D
Ocellularia daniana 
Ocellularia decolorata 
Ocellularia deformis 
Ocellularia diacida 
Ocellularia diffractella 
Ocellularia diminuta  – Brazil
Ocellularia diospyri  – Thailand
Ocellularia diplotrema 
Ocellularia discoidea 
Ocellularia dodecamera  – Colombia
Ocellularia dolichotata 
Ocellularia domingensis 
Ocellularia dominicana 
Ocellularia dussii

E

Ocellularia ecolumellata 
Ocellularia elixii  – Thailand
Ocellularia emergens 
Ocellularia endoleuca 
Ocellularia endoperidermica 
Ocellularia epitrypa 
Ocellularia erodens 
Ocellularia etayoi  – Panama
Ocellularia eumorpha 
Ocellularia eumorphoides 
Ocellularia eurychades 
Ocellularia exigua 
Ocellularia extendens

F
Ocellularia fecunda 
Ocellularia fenestrata  – Peru
Ocellularia flavescens  – Thailand
Ocellularia flavida 
Ocellularia flavisorediata 
Ocellularia flavomedullosa 
Ocellularia flavoperforata 
Ocellularia flavostroma  – Brazil
Ocellularia fuscosporella  – New Caledonia

G
Ocellularia garoana 
Ocellularia gentingensis 
Ocellularia gerardoi 
Ocellularia gibberulosa 
Ocellularia gigantospora  – Philippines
Ocellularia glaziovii 
Ocellularia globifera 
Ocellularia globosa 
Ocellularia goniostoma 
Ocellularia gracilis 
Ocellularia grandis 
Ocellularia granpiedrensis 
Ocellularia grantii 
Ocellularia granulatula 
Ocellularia granulifera 
Ocellularia groenhartii 
Ocellularia gueidaniana  – Singapore
Ocellularia guianensis 
Ocellularia guptei 
Ocellularia gymnocarpa

H
Ocellularia halei  – Brazil
Ocellularia henatomma 
Ocellularia hernandeziana 
Ocellularia holospora 
Ocellularia homopasta

I
Ocellularia immersocarpa  – Brazil
Ocellularia imshaugii 
Ocellularia inconspicua  – New Caledonia
Ocellularia inexpectata 
Ocellularia inspersata 
Ocellularia inspersula 
Ocellularia interponenda 
Ocellularia interposita 
Ocellularia inthanonensis  – Thailand
Ocellularia inturgescens 
Ocellularia isidioalbula 
Ocellularia isidiza  – Venezuela
Ocellularia isohypocrellina

J

Ocellularia jamesii

K
Ocellularia kalbii 
Ocellularia kanneliyensis 
Ocellularia kansriae  – Thailand
Ocellularia karnatakensis 
Ocellularia keralensis 
Ocellularia khaoyaiana 
Ocellularia khasiana 
Ocellularia khuntanensis 
Ocellularia klinhomii  – Thailand
Ocellularia kohphangangensis  – Thailand
Ocellularia krathingensis  – Thailand

L
Ocellularia lacerata  – Brazil
Ocellularia laevigatula 
Ocellularia laeviuscula 
Ocellularia laeviusculoides 
Ocellularia landronii 
Ocellularia lathraea 
Ocellularia latilabra 
Ocellularia leioplacoides 
Ocellularia leptopora 
Ocellularia leucina 
Ocellularia leucocarpoides 
Ocellularia leucocavata  – Philippines
Ocellularia leucotrema 
Ocellularia leucotylia 
Ocellularia liamuiga 
Ocellularia lithophila  – Brazil
Ocellularia lumbschii  – Vietnam
Ocellularia lunensis  – Cuba

M
Ocellularia macrocrocea 
Ocellularia macrospora 
Ocellularia mahabalei 
Ocellularia mammicula 
Ocellularia margaritacea 
Ocellularia maricaoensis 
Ocellularia marmorata  – Argentina
Ocellularia masonhalei 
Ocellularia massalongoi 
Ocellularia mauritiana 
Ocellularia maxima 
Ocellularia megalospora  – Philippines
Ocellularia melanostoma 
Ocellularia microascidium 
Ocellularia microsorediata  – Peru
Ocellularia microstoma 
Ocellularia misionensis  – Argentina
Ocellularia monosporoides 
Ocellularia mordenii 
Ocellularia myrioporella 
Ocellularia myriotrema  – Brazil

N
Ocellularia natashae  – Peru
Ocellularia neocaledonica  – New Caledonia
Ocellularia neocavata 
Ocellularia neoleucina  – Thailand
Ocellularia neomasonhalei 
Ocellularia neoperforata  – Thailand
Ocellularia neopertusariiformis 
Ocellularia nigririmis  – Cuba
Ocellularia nigropuncta 
Ocellularia nureliya  – India

O
Ocellularia obovata 
Ocellularia obscura 
Ocellularia obturascens 
Ocellularia octolocularis 
Ocellularia oculata 
Ocellularia ornata  – Brazil
Ocellularia orthomastia

P

Ocellularia palianensis  – Thailand
Ocellularia papillata 
Ocellularia papillifera  – Argentina
Ocellularia papuana 
Ocellularia parvidisca 
Ocellularia parvula 
Ocellularia pauciseptata 
Ocellularia peremergens  – Thailand
Ocellularia perforata 
Ocellularia permaculata 
Ocellularia persimilis 
Ocellularia pertusarioides 
Ocellularia petrinensis  – Mauritius
Ocellularia phaeotropa 
Ocellularia phatamensis  – Thailand
Ocellularia pichinchensis 
Ocellularia piperis 
Ocellularia pitalensis 
Ocellularia planaria 
Ocellularia platychlamys 
Ocellularia plicata  – Peru
Ocellularia pluripora 
Ocellularia pluriporoides  – Thailand
Ocellularia polydisca  – Brazil
Ocellularia pomiformis 
Ocellularia poncinsiana 
Ocellularia portoricensis  – Puerto Rico
Ocellularia poschlodiana  – Thailand
Ocellularia postposita 
Ocellularia praestans 
Ocellularia praestantoides 
Ocellularia protoinspersa  – Peru
Ocellularia protomegaspora 
Ocellularia psathyroloma 
Ocellularia pseudochapsa  – Brazil
Ocellularia pseudopapillata  – Thailand
Ocellularia pseudopyrenuloides 
Ocellularia pseudostromatica  – Brazil
Ocellularia psorbarroensis 
Ocellularia psoromica 
Ocellularia pulchella  – New Caledonia
Ocellularia punctulata 
Ocellularia pustulata  – Peru
Ocellularia pycnophragmia 
Ocellularia pyrenuloides

R

Ocellularia radiata  – Cuba
Ocellularia rassagala 
Ocellularia ratnapurensis 
Ocellularia raveniana  – Sri Lanka
Ocellularia reticulata 
Ocellularia retispora 
Ocellularia rhabdospora  – Brazil
Ocellularia rhicnopora 
Ocellularia rhicnoporoides  – Thailand
Ocellularia rhodostroma 
Ocellularia ripleyi 
Ocellularia rivasplatiana  – Singapore
Ocellularia rondoniana  – Brazil
Ocellularia rongklaensis 
Ocellularia roseotecta  – Thailand
Ocellularia rotundifumosa  – Thailand
Ocellularia rubropolydiscus  – Brazil
Ocellularia rudior 
Ocellularia rugosa 
Ocellularia rugosothallina  – New Caledonia

S

Ocellularia salazinica  – Thailand
Ocellularia salmonea  – New Caledonia
Ocellularia sanfordiana 
Ocellularia saxicola  – Vietnam
Ocellularia soralifera 
Ocellularia sorediata 
Ocellularia soredica 
Ocellularia sorediigera 
Ocellularia squamuloides 
Ocellularia stictica 
Ocellularia sticticans 
Ocellularia straminea 
Ocellularia striata 
Ocellularia subcalvescens 
Ocellularia subcarassensis 
Ocellularia subdolichotata  – Thailand
Ocellularia subfumosa 
Ocellularia subgranulosa 
Ocellularia subkeralensis  – India
Ocellularia sublaeviusculoides  – Philippines
Ocellularia subleucina  – Thailand
Ocellularia subminuta 
Ocellularia subperforata  – India
Ocellularia subpraestans 
Ocellularia subpyrenuloides 
Ocellularia subsimilis 
Ocellularia subudupiensis  – Singapore
Ocellularia supergracilis

T
Ocellularia tacarcunae 
Ocellularia tanii 
Ocellularia terebrata 
Ocellularia terrabensis 
Ocellularia thailandica  – Thailand
Ocellularia thelotrematoides 
Ocellularia thryptica 
Ocellularia tomatlanensis 
Ocellularia trachodes 
Ocellularia tuberculata 
Ocellularia turbinata 
Ocellularia turgidula 
Ocellularia udupiensis

U
Ocellularia umbilicata 
Ocellularia umbilicatoides  – Colombia
Ocellularia upretii  – India
Ocellularia usnicolor  – Colombia

V
Ocellularia verrucomarginata  – India
Ocellularia verrucosa 
Ocellularia verruculosa 
Ocellularia vezdana 
Ocellularia violacea 
Ocellularia virens 
Ocellularia viridipallens 
Ocellularia viridis 
Ocellularia vizcayensis 
Ocellularia vulcanisorediata  – Puerto Rico

W
Ocellularia wandoorensis  – Andaman Islands
Ocellularia wirthii 
Ocellularia wolseleyana  – Thailand

X
Ocellularia xantholeuca 
Ocellularia xanthostroma 
Ocellularia xanthostromiza

Z
Ocellularia zamorana 
Ocellularia zenkeri

References

Ocellularia